The anthem of the Guárico State, Venezuela, has the lyrics written by Pedro Pablo Montenegro; the music corresponds to Salvador Llamozas. Like the Cojedes State Anthem, it has only one stanza.

Lyrics in Spanish Language

Chorus 
Nunca ofendes, ¡oh pueblo del Guárico!, 
En luchas civiles tu sangre y valor: 
Pero alza, extermina con ímpetu 
Si huella tu patria guerrero invasor.

I 
Por las pampas inmensas del Guárico,
Donde pierdes el potro cerril, 
En augusta carrera cual símbolo, 
Animo libre de un pueblo viril, 
Por las pampas inmensas del Guárico
Se oye de noche vibrar un clarín.

See also
 List of anthems of Venezuela

Anthems of Venezuela
Spanish-language songs